Heliotropium kuriense is a species of plant in the family Boraginaceae. It is endemic to Yemen.  Its natural habitat is subtropical or tropical dry shrubland.

References

Endemic flora of Socotra
kuriense
Vulnerable plants
Taxonomy articles created by Polbot